The Worst of Black Box Recorder is a 2001 album by Black Box Recorder, whose members include Luke Haines, Sarah Nixey and John Moore. It is a compilation of B-sides from the singles of England Made Me and The Facts Of Life.

It also contains videos for 4 of their singles: "The Facts of Life", "Child Psychology", "The Art of Driving" and "England Made Me".

Track listing
 "Seasons in the Sun"  – 2:37
 "Watch the Angel Not the Wire"  – 2:20
 "Jackie Sixty"  – 2:13
 "Start as You Mean to Go On"  – 2:30
 "The Facts of Life" (Remix by The Chocolate Layers)  – 6:24
 "Lord Lucan is Missing"  – 1:49
 "Wonderful Life"  – 2:13
 "Uptown Top Ranking" (Remix by Black Box Recorder)  – 4:09
 "Brutality"  – 2:17
 "Factory Radio"  – 2:11
 "Soul Boy"  – 2:11
 "Rock 'N' Roll Suicide"  – 5:38
 "The Facts of Life" (Multimedia track)  – 2:13
 "Child Psychology" (Multimedia track)   – 4:09
 "The Art of Driving" (Multimedia track)  – 2:17
 "England Made Me" (Multimedia track)  – 2:11

Cover versions
Track 1 "Seasons in the Sun" - Original by Jacques Brel
Track 6 "Lord Lucan is Missing" - Original by The Dodgems
Track 8 "Uptown Top Ranking"  - Original by Althea & Donna
Track 12 "Rock 'n' Roll Suicide" - Original by David Bowie

References

Black Box Recorder albums
Luke Haines albums
Albums produced by Phil Vinall
2000 compilation albums
Jetset Records albums